The Egypt national under-20 football team is the national youth team of Egypt. It's administered by the Egyptian Football Association.

Their best performance in the U-20 World Cup was third place which was achieved in 2001. This remains to be the highest result Egypt has achieved in any International World Cup.

Their nickname, The Young Pharaohs is an obvious reference to the nickname of the National Team, The Pharaohs.

Egypt hosted the 2009 U-20 World Cup.

FIFA U-20 World Cup record

FIFA World Youth Championship

 Red border color indicates tournament was held on home soil.

2013 FIFA U-20 World Cup

Egypt qualified after winning the 2013 African U-20 Championship. They failed to pass through the group stage after only winning one game.

Tournament Records

Africa U-20 Cup of Nations

Arab Cup U-20 record

North-African U-20 Cup record

Honors
World Cups :
 Bronze Medalists at the 2001 FIFA World Youth Championship

Recent results and fixtures

Current squad
players called up for 2022 Arab Cup U-20

Head coach:  Mahmoud Gaber

See also
 Egypt national football team
 Egyptian Premier League
Fifa 20 Egypt 
 Egypt Cup
 Egyptian Super Cup
 List of football clubs in Egypt

References

External links
 Egyptian FA official site
 fifa 19 in egypt
 Egyptian Players
 Egyptian Soccer and Sports
 All About Egyptian Soccer
 Information on National team and club football in Egypt
 
 
 
 

African national under-20 association football teams
Under